Kevin McHale may refer to:
 Kevin McHale (footballer) (born 1939), English former professional footballer
 Kevin McHale (basketball) (born 1957), American former basketball player, coach, and executive
 Kevin McHale (actor) (born 1988), American actor and singer